Percy William Gabbe (1902-1964) was an Australian rugby league footballer who played in the 1920s.

Playing career
Perc Gabbe played with the St. George club for four seasons and was a fullback. He retired in 1926. 

Gabbe was also a handy cricketer for the Kogarah Cricket Club and enjoyed golf at Bexley Golf Club until his death. 

Perc Gabbe died on 24 October 1964.

References

St. George Dragons players
Australian rugby league players
1902 births
1964 deaths
Rugby league players from Queensland
Rugby league fullbacks